Sobrevivendo no Inferno ("Surviving in Hell") is the fourth studio album of the Brazilian rap group Racionais MC's, released in December 1997. The album reached the mark of 1,500,000 copies sold, despite having been released by an independent record label. Sobrevivendo no Inferno was ranked 14th on the 100 Greatest Brazilian music albums of Rolling Stone magazine.

A feature in the album is the presence of Biblical-inspired lyrics, as in the songs "Genesis" and "Capítulo 4, Versículo 3" (both by Mano Brown). The album is also heavy on lyrics discussing to social inequalities, poverty and racism. The big hits were "Diário de Um Detento" (based on the diary of Jocenir, former inmate of the Carandiru prison), "Fórmula Mágica da Paz" and "Mágico de Oz" (Edy Rock). The group also paid tribute to the singer Jorge Ben Jor, rewriting "Jorge da Capadócia." The musical arrangements are simple, with a basic drum and some keyboard melody.

KL Jay is also the producer of the album "Fita Mixada Rotação 33" in 2008, and a trilogy started with "Na Batida Volule 3 (Equilíbrio - A Busca)" in 2001 and continued with "na Batida Volume 2 – (No Quarto Sozinho)" in 2018. Their songs are played both by KL Jay and other hip hop groups.

In 2018, the album was included by the University of Campinas on the list of required readings for its 2020 entrance exam.  Months later, the work became a book published by Companhia das Letras, featuring unpublished photos and information about the group.

Tracks

Formation
 Mano Brown
 Ice Blue
 Edy Rock
 KL Jay

References

1997 albums
Racionais MC's albums